Black Jack is a rural locality in the Charters Towers Region, Queensland, Australia. In the  Black Jack had a population of 161 people.

It was formerly a mining town which is now abandoned.

Geography 
Black Jack is a triangular-shaped locality. The Great Northern railway line forms the northern boundary of Black Jack. There are two railway stations within the locality, Wellington Yards railway station in the far north-east corner (on the outskirts of the suburban area of Charters Towers) and Southern Cross railway station on its north-west border.

The Flinders Highway passes through the northern part of the locality, while the Diamantina Road forms its eastern boundary.

Black Jack is approximately 350 metres above sea level rising to peaks in its south-west of 450 metres.

History 
The Black Jack P. C. mine produced large quantities of gold in 1886 and 1887 (known as the Black Jack Boom) but then produced very little in subsequent years.

Black Jack Provisional School opened on 21 March 1887. It became Black Jack State School on 6 July 1891. It closed in 1949.

In the  Black Jack had a population of 161 people.

References

Further reading

External links 

Charters Towers Region
Localities in Queensland
Mining towns in Queensland